Kristo Kondakçi (born 30 June 1991) is an Albanian-American conductor who is currently the music director of the Kendall Square Orchestra, the Eureka Ensemble, and the Narragansett Bay Symphony Community Orchestra. He is also the cofounder of the Women's Chorus, a choral program for women experiencing homelessness in Boston. 

Kondakçi is an assistant professor of conducting at the Berklee College of Music. He has previously served as director of orchestras in an interim capacity at the University of Massachusetts, Amherst (2019) as well as assistant conductor with the Boston Landmarks Orchestra (2015-2017) and conducting fellow of the Boston Philharmonic Orchestra and the Boston Philharmonic Youth Orchestra (2015-2018).

Early life 
Kristo Kondakçi was born in Tirana, Albania in 1991. He immigrated to the United States with his family as political refugees when Kondakçi was five years old.

Political persecution in Albania 
During the 20th Century, many members of Kondakçi's family were brutally persecuted by Albanian Dictator Enver Hoxha and the Albanian Communist regime. Kondakçi's maternal grandfather, Beqir Omari, was imprisoned for eight years in the notorious Spaç Prison for performing western music. Beqir Omari's brother, Gramoz, was a virtuoso musician and doctor who was executed by Enver Hoxha in 1968. Beqir's father (Kondakçi's great-grandfather), Eqerem Omari, was a noted agricultural scientist and one of the most important grain specialists in Albania.

Eqerem was a relative of noted Albanian politician Bahri Omari. Bahri Omari moved to the United States in 1914 to serve as chief editor of the first Albanian-American Newspaper, Dielli. He then returned to Albania in the 1920s to serve as general secretary of the National Democratic Party of Albania and then as Minister of Foreign Affairs in the 1940s. In 1945, after the Communist Regime came to power under Enver Hoxha, Bahri Omari was put on trial and executed.

Many other family members were either executed, imprisoned, exiled, or sent to internment areas.

Kristo Kondakçi's grandfather, Beqir Omari, also immigrated to the United States to help raise him and his brother, Gramoz Kondakçi. At home, his grandfather would regularly make music and recount stories about the family and their history of Albania.

Education 
Kristo Kondakçi's main instrument was the piano. He began teaching himself at the age of eleven after receiving a keyboard as a gift. He attended Sacred Heart School in Quincy, Massachusetts and continued at Boston College High School, graduating in 2009.

At the age of fifteen, Kondakçi began attending the preparatory school of New England Conservatory, studying piano with Tatyana Dudochkin, composition with Rodney Lister, and musical interpretation and conducting with Benjamin Zander and Courtney Lewis.

After graduating high school, he continued his studies at New England Conservatory, completing an Undergraduate degree in Composition with composer Michael Gandolfi (2013) and a Master's degree in Conducting with Charles Peltz (2015).

Reconstruction of the 1889 version of Mahler's First Symphony 
During his undergraduate studies in 2011, Kristo Kondakçi became involved in a special project to mark the centennial of composer Gustav Mahler's death. With oversight and guidance by New England Conservatory professor Katarina Markovic and conductor Hugh Wolff, Kondakçi reconstructed a performing edition of the earliest version of Mahler's Symphony No. 1, which was thought to be lost for over 100 years, based on two of the earliest manuscript sources for the symphony. The New England Conservatory Philharmonia performed this version in September 2011 under conductor Hugh Wolff to mark a semester long school festival around Mahler's music. The concert marked the American premiere of this earliest version of the first symphony, and the first time it has been heard in this form since its 1889 premiere.

Conducting career 
In 2014, while Kondakçi was pursuing his master's degree in conducting at New England Conservatory, he received an invitation from the National Theatre of Opera and Ballet of Albania (T.K.O.B.) to conduct the National Albanian Orchestra, which launched his professional conducting career. He appeared in two performances with the orchestra, conducting the overture from Wagner's opera Tannhäuser and Mahler's Symphony No. 1. The concerts were successful, receiving praise from the Albanian public and press. Kondakçi maintains ties with the T.K.O.B.<ref>{{Citation |title=Vila 24 Emisioni I Mengjesit – TKOB çel sezonin artistik me Sinfonine Nr. 1 te G. Mahler |url=https://www.youtube.com/watch?v=7HuC_sY7rH8 |language=en |access-date=2022-07-20}}</ref>

After returning to the U.S. from Albania, Kondakçi was named the assistant conductor of the Boston Landmarks Orchestra, a professional orchestra in Boston, MA dedicated to making great music accessible to the whole community (2015-2017). During his time with the orchestra, Kondakçi reinvigorated the orchestra's community educational programming.

Upon graduating New England Conservatory in 2015, Kondakçi was named the conducting fellow of the Boston Philharmonic Orchestra (BPO) and Boston Philharmonic Youth Orchestra (2015-2018).  He also accompanied BPO conductor Benjamin Zander in concerts around the globe, including performances of Mahler's Symphony No. 2 in Kuala Lumpur, Malaysia with the Malaysian Philharmonic Orchestra (2015).

During his tenure with Boston Philharmonic, Kondakçi traveled with the Boston Philharmonic Youth Orchestra on three international tours. He also designed and conducted the annual Young Composer's Initiative in partnership with the composition departments at New England Conservatory, Boston Conservatory, Berklee School of Music, and Harvard University, among others.

 Eureka Ensemble 
In 2017, Kondakçi partnered with cellist Alan Toda-Ambaras to launch the Eureka Ensemble, a professional orchestra based in Boston, dedicated to nurturing social impact through music. Since its founding, the ensemble has partnered with acclaimed artists such as violist Kim Kashkashian and violinist Midori to engage in community-intensive programming focusing on immigrant and refugee youth and those impacted by homelessness. Eureka Ensemble has also partnered with the School for the Environment at UMass Boston to address the impacts of climate change through music.

 Sheltering Voices and the Women's Chorus 
In 2018, Eureka Ensemble launched the Sheltering Voices Initiative, partnering with Boston area women's shelters to "empower women artists and composers, homeless women, educate the public on domestic abuse issues, and support local homeless shelters". The program featured a choir for women experiencing homelessness or poverty and a commission by composer Stephanie Ann Boyd.  The project was covered by NowThis News in a short video that has been viewed over 3 million times on social media.

As a direct result of Sheltering Voices, Kondakçi partnered with his close friend and entrepreneur David McCue to launch the Women's Chorus in partnership with the Women's Lunch Place, a local shelter. The Women's Chorus connects women in Boston experiencing homelessness or poverty with the "healing power of music". Since its founding in 2018, it has served over 100 women ages 17–82.

In 2019, the Berklee College of Music honored Kondakçi with a "Berklee Urban Service Award" (BUSA) for his work. "The Berklee Urban Service Awards celebrate community members, partner organizations, politicians, artists, and Berklee affiliates who inspire social change in the Greater Boston area". He was also profiled by the Christian Science Monitor in their "Difference-Makers" Series.

 Desea Soñar and El Mesías 
In 2018, Eureka partnered with La Colaborativa (formerly known as the Chelsea Collaborative) to create an after-school music education program for newly arrived immigrant and refugee youth in Chelsea and East Boston, MA called "Desea Soñar" (I want to dream). As a part of the program, Kondakçi spearheaded a Spanish transcription of Handel's famed Messiah Oratorio with the Eureka Ensemble team and performed the new version in 2019.

 Kendall Square Orchestra 
In 2018, Kondakçi was engaged by a pharmaceutical company to help launch an orchestra for the life sciences and technology community in Kendall Square, Cambridge, MA. Together with scientists Kelly Clark and Elena Spencer, they formed the Kendall Square Orchestra. The orchestra, now in its fourth year, represents over 40 local science and technology companies and academic institutions in the Cambridge-Boston area.

 Symphony for Science 
In 2019, under Kondakçi's leadership, the Kendall Square Orchestra team designed an innovative benefit event titled "Symphony for Science", featuring a combination of talks by local scientific leaders and musical performances to support healthcare and science related causes. The inaugural "Symphony for Science" took place on May 20, 2019, at Boston's Symphony Hall to benefit Massachusetts General Hospital's Frontotemporal Dementia Research Unit. The event raised over $42,000 and featured members of the Boston Symphony Orchestra, including Boston Pops conductor Keith Lockhart on piano.

In 2020, due to the lockdowns, Symphony for Science took place virtually to benefit Next Step, a Cambridge community organization that "provides programming for young individuals (age 14-29) managing life-threatening illnesses including rare genetic diseases, cancer and HIV. The use of music therapy is a key element of their programming and services". Symphony for Science 2020 raised over $75,000 dollars.

Symphony for Science 2022 took place on May 23, 2022, at Symphony Hall Boston to benefit Science Club for Girls and featured Nobel Prize winner Esther Duflo as keynote speaker. The event raised over $50,000 for Science Club for Girls.

 University of Massachusetts Amherst 
In 2019, Kristo Kondakçi joined the faculty of UMass Amherst for one term as interim director of orchestras, stepping in for conductor Morihiko Nakahara while he was on leave. Kondakçi led the graduate conducting program and conducted the two university orchestras.

 COVID-19: Boston Hope Music 
In 2020, in response to the COVID-19 Pandemic and the resulting lockdowns, Kristo Kondakçi joined Dr. Lisa Wong and Dr. Ronald Hirschberg to help form "Boston Hope Music" (BHM) at Boston Hope Hospital, a 1000-bed field hospital that was set up by the City of Boston in 2020. This field hospital, based at the Boston Convention Center, was designed to care for Covid-positive patients recovering from Covid after hospital discharge, as well as homeless patients who were Covid-positive in need of respite care and isolation. Boston Hope Music gathered over 100 musicians from the around the city of Boston together who submitted "musical doses" electronically. These were curated into over 25 playlists that patients could access via Samsung tablets three times a day to promote healing.

The BHM team also created a program in partnership with Massachusetts General Hospital, New England Conservatory, and the Eureka Ensemble to focus on the growing needs of frontline healthcare workers by connecting them private lessons on instruments of their choice as well as songwriting workshops. When the vaccine became available, BHM organized musicians to play for members of the general public waiting in line for the vaccinations at the Red Sox's Fenway Park, Hynes Convention Center, the Reggie Lewis Center and Mass General's satellite site at Assembly Row in Somerville.

 Narragansett Bay Symphony Community Orchestra (NaBSCO) 
In 2020, Kristo Kondakçi was named music director of the Narragansett Bay Symphony Community Orchestra (NaBSCO), which is based in Providence, RI. NaBSCO is the premier community-based orchestra in Rhode Island and plays large orchestral repertoire.

 Guest conducting 
Kristo Kondakçi maintains an active guest conducting profile with orchestras in both the United States and Europe.

In June 2018, Kondakçi made his European opera conducting debut at the Vienna Summer Music Festival in Vienna, Austria, conducting the world premiere of Scott Joiner's "The Bridesmaids".

Kondakçi made his U.S. opera conducting debut in January 2020, directing performances of Benjamin Britten's Turn of the Screw'' with Enigma Chamber Opera.

Teaching 
Kondakçi is currently an assistant professor at the Berklee College of Music and a non-resident music tutor at Harvard University's Pfhorzeimer House.

Speaking 
Kristo Kondakçi maintains an active public speaking profile. In 2019, He gave a talk at the League of American Orchestras as a featured speaker on the "Orchestra as a Community Organization". Kondakçi also works closely with TEDxBoston and gave a TEDx talk in 2018

Personal life 
Kristo Kondakçi resides in Boston, MA with his wife, Chloe Kondakçi. He has a younger brother, Gramoz Kondakçi, who is a scientist and researcher based in Cambridge, MA. His parents, Jolanda Omari and Dhimiter Kondakçi, also reside in Massachusetts.

References

External links 
 Official Website
 Kristo Kondakçi at TEDxBoston

American conductors (music)
1991 births
People from Tirana
Immigrants to the United States
Boston College High School alumni
New England Conservatory alumni
Albanian conductors (music)
University of Massachusetts Amherst faculty
Albanian musicians
Male conductors (music)
Living people
21st-century conductors (music)
21st-century male musicians
Harvard University people
Political refugees in the United States
Albanian-American culture in Massachusetts